Flying Saucer (also called XHTML renderer) is a pure Java library for rendering XML, XHTML, and CSS 2.1 content.

It is intended for embedding web-based user interfaces into Java applications, but cannot be used as a general purpose web browser since it does not support HTML.

Thanks to its capability to save rendered XHTML to PDF (using iText), it is often used as a server side library to generate PDF documents. It has extended support for print-related things like pagination and page headers and footers.

History
Flying Saucer was started in 2004 by Joshua Marinacci, who was later hired by Sun Microsystems. It is still an open-source project unrelated to Sun.

Sun Microsystems once planned to include Flying Saucer in F3, the scripting language based on the Java platform which later became JavaFX Script.

Compliance
Flying saucer has very good XHTML markup and CSS 2.1 standards compliance, even in complex cases.

See also
 JavaFX
 List of web browsers
 Lobo, a Java-based browser with support for HTML 4, JavaScript and CSS2

References

External links
 Flying Saucer Project Website on Github
 Generate PDF with Flying Saucer
 
 Generating PDFs with Java, Flying Saucer and Thymeleaf (Part 1)
 Generating PDFs with Java, Flying Saucer and Thymeleaf (Part 2)

Java APIs
Java (programming language) libraries
Free PDF software